The London, Midland and Scottish Railway (LMS) Fowler 3F  is a class of steam locomotives, often known as Jinty.  They represent the ultimate development of the Midland Railway's six-coupled tank engines. They could reach speeds of up to 60 mph (97 km/h).

Introduction 

Design of this class was based on rebuilds by Henry Fowler of the Midland Railway 2441 Class introduced in 1899 by Samuel Waite Johnson. These rebuilds featured a Belpaire firebox and improved cab. 422 Jinties were built between 1924 and 1931; this class was just one of the Midland designs used on an ongoing basis by the LMS. The locomotives were built by the ex-L&YR Horwich Works and the private firms Bagnall's, Beardmores, Hunslet, North British and the Vulcan Foundry.

Details 

When new, they were numbered 7100–7149, 16400–16764. Numbers 7150–7156 were added when the LMS absorbed the Somerset and Dorset Joint Railway locomotives in 1930. In the 1934 LMS renumbering scheme, the locomotives were assigned the series 7260–7681. On the outbreak of the Second World War in 1939 they were initially chosen as the standard shunting locomotive for the War Department, but later the more modern Hunslet "Austerity"  was chosen in preference. Nevertheless, eight were dispatched to France before its fall in 1940, and only five returned in 1948. Two, 7456 and 7553, were converted to the  Irish broad gauge in 1944 and 1945 for use on Northern Counties Committee lines in Northern Ireland, becoming the NCC Class Y, and numbered 18 and 19. A total of 412 thus entered British Railways stock in 1948, rising to 417 by the end of the year.

British Railways numbers were the LMS numbers prefixed with '4'. Numbers 47477, 47478, 47479, 47480, 47481, 47655 and 47681 were fitted for push-pull train working.

Withdrawal
The first withdrawals started in 1959 and by 1964 half had been withdrawn. The final five survived until 1967, with a further one, 47445 continuing with the National Coal Board.

Preservation 
Thanks to their large numbers, renowned performance and late withdrawals, nine of these engines have been preserved, along with a spare set of frames and a boiler (from 47564). Many were restored within a few years of leaving the scrap heap, and most have a further working life ahead of them. All have steamed in preservation, with the exception of 47445.

One member of the class has operated on the main line in preservation. This was 7298/47298, which took part during the Rainhill celebrations in 1980 when it hauled a number of Steamport residents from the museum in Southport to Rainhill and also took part in the cavalcade. Owned by Ian Riley, in February 2017 it was undergoing its "ten-yearly overhaul" and was expected to return to operation "in a couple of years".

Locations and condition are shown below (current numbers in bold):

In fiction 

An engine of this type can be seen in the Rev. W. Awdry's The Railway Series book 'The Eight Famous Engines'. The character's name was Jinty, and came from the "Other Railway" (aka British Railways) to help out when the main engines went on a journey to England.

In the videogame Transport Tycoon of Chris Sawyer, the Jinty is offered as the cheapest and most basic engine of the game.

Models 
An OO gauge model of the Class 3F was first produced by Tri-ang in 1952 and production continued after the company became Hornby Railways in the 1970s. Hornby released a retooled version in 1978 with better detailing and continue to produce that model for their "Railroad" range.

In the 2000s Bachmann Branchline released a more detailed OO model. In N gauge Graham Farish produced a model as a "GP Tank" in various liveries including some of other railway companies before later tooling an accurate 'Jinty' model. In O gauge and Gauge 1 Bachmann Brassworks produce an example. In O gauge, Connoisseur Models produces an etched brass kit. In HO (3.5 mm) scale Firedrake Productions produced a small run of 20 kits.

Darstaed, a model train company in Great Britain, produced O gauge tintype models of the LMS Fowler Class 3F, affectionately referring to them by the nickname of Jinty 

Dapol has produced a Jinty for the O gauge market which was released in September 2017

References

External links 

LMS Jinty at Spa Valley Railway - 28 April 2004 - Photo gallery

0-6-0T locomotives
3F 0-6-0T
Bagnall locomotives
William Beardmore and Company locomotives
Hunslet locomotives
NBL locomotives
Vulcan Foundry locomotives
Preserved London, Midland and Scottish Railway steam locomotives
Railway locomotives introduced in 1924
Standard gauge steam locomotives of Great Britain
C n2t locomotives
Shunting locomotives